Harold Goodwin (22 October 1917 – 3 June 2004) was an English actor born in Wombwell, South Yorkshire, England.

Acting career
Goodwin trained at RADA and was a stage actor at Liverpool repertory theatre for 3 years. He appeared in numerous British films of the 1950s and 1960s, usually playing 'flat cap'-wearing working class characters from Northern England or low ranks in the military.

He had significant parts in the war films The Dam Busters (playing Guy Gibson's batman, 'Crosby'), Bridge on the River Kwai and The Longest Day. He can also be seen in films such as The Ladykillers, Sea of Sand, Angels One Five and The Cruel Sea (in which he was the ASDIC operator). 

Goodwin made hundreds of appearances in British television programmes such as Minder (as Dunning, episode [[List_of_Minder_episodes#Get Daley!|Get Daley!, 1984]]) and a notable role in All Creatures Great and Small. Goodwin was a 'staple' of the popular 1980s sitcom, That's My Boy. 

His last major television appearance was playing the part of Joss Shackleton, father to Vera Duckworth, in the ITV soap opera Coronation Street in 1991. His final television appearance was as a window cleaner in One Foot in the Grave in 1992.

Filmography

 Young and Innocent  (1937) – Driver of the pig-cart (uncredited)
 The Happiest Days of Your Life (1950) – Edwin
 Dance Hall (1950) – Jack
 The Magnet (1950) – Pin-Table Attendant
 The Galloping Major (1951) - Street Stall Owner (uncredited)
 The Man in the White Suit (1951) – Wilkins
 Appointment with Venus (1951) – 2nd Naval Rating
 Green Grow the Rushes (1951) – Gosling
 The Last Page (1952) – Frank the Waiter (uncredited)
 Judgment Deferred (1952)
 The Card (1952) – John (uncredited)
 Angels One Five (1952) – A.C. 2 Wailes
 The Cruel Sea (1953) – ASDIC Operator
 Grand National Night (1953)
 The Million Pound Note (1954) – Horace (uncredited)
 The Gay Dog (1954) – Bert Gay
 The Harassed Hero (1954) – Twigg
 The Ship That Died of Shame (1955) – Second Customs Officer
 A Kid for Two Farthings (1955) – Chick Man (uncredited)
 The Dam Busters (1955) – Wing Comdr. Gibson's Batman
 The Ladykillers (1955) – Parcels Clerk (uncredited)
 You Lucky People (1955) – Pvt. Rossiter
 Now and Forever (1956) – Lorry driver
 Who Done It? (1956) – Pringle (uncredited)
 Charley Moon (1956) – Sid
 The Long Arm (1956) – Official at Somerset House
 The Last Man to Hang? (1956) – Cheed
 Zarak (1956) – Sgt. Higgins
 Three Men in a Boat (1956) – Maze Keeper (Maze)
 Carry On Admiral (1957) – Parker (uncredited)
 Sea Wife (1957) – Daily Telegraph Clerk
 The Prince and the Showgirl (1957) – Call Boy
 The Bridge on the River Kwai (1957) – Baker
 Barnacle Bill (1957) – Duckworth
 Law and Disorder (1958) – Blacky
 Girls at Sea (1958) – Wal
 Sea of Sand (1958) – Road Watch
 The Square Peg (1958) – (uncredited)
 Quatermass and the Pit (1958) - Corporal Gibson
 The Captain's Table (1959) – Matthews (uncredited)
 The Mummy (1959) – Pat
 The Ugly Duckling (1959)
 Wrong Number (1959) – Bates
 Sink the Bismarck! (1960) – Airman in Phone Montage (uncredited)
 Operation Cupid (1960) – Mervyn
 The Bulldog Breed (1960) – Streaky Hopkinson
 The Terror of the Tongs (1961)
 Nearly a Nasty Accident (1961) – Aircraft Mechanic
 On the Fiddle (1961) – Corporal Reeves
 Never Back Losers (1961) – Floyd
  Scotland Yard (film series) - (1961) - The Square Mile Murder - Fingers McLeod
 Hair of the Dog (1962) – Percy
 Crooks Anonymous (1962) – George
 The Traitors (1962) – Edwards
 The Phantom of the Opera (1962) – Bill
 The Longest Day (1962) – British Soldier (uncredited)
 The Fast Lady (1962)
 The Hi-Jackers (1963) – Scouse
 The Comedy Man (1964) – Second Assistant Director
 The Curse of the Mummy's Tomb (1964) – Fred
 Die, Monster, Die! (1965) – Taxi Driver (UK version)
 Don't Raise the Bridge, Lower the River (1968) – Six-Eyes Wiener
 Frankenstein Must Be Destroyed (1969) – Burglar (uncredited)
 The Bushbaby (1969) – Steward
 Hoverbug (1969) – Feeney
 Some Will, Some Won't (1970) – Williams
 Rogue's Rock (1974–1976) – Hawkins
 All Creatures Great and Small (1975) – Dinsdale's Uncle
 Oh No It's Selwyn Froggitt (1976–1977, TV Series) – Harry
 Jabberwocky'' (1977) – 1st Peasant

References

External links
 

1917 births
2004 deaths
People from Wombwell
English male film actors
English male television actors
Alumni of RADA
Male actors from Yorkshire